Neil Hedley Langman (born 21 February 1932) is an English retired footballer who played as a centre forward.

Langman started his career with local amateur club Tavistock before signing for Football League club Plymouth Argyle in 1954.

He scored 50 goals in 99 appearances for the club before he joined Colchester United in 1957 for £6,750. He was released in 1961 and then joined Bath City. In 1964 he joined Falmouth Town and played 63 in matches, scoring 67 goals.

References

External links
 Newcastlefans

1932 births
Living people
English footballers
Tavistock A.F.C. players
Plymouth Argyle F.C. players
Colchester United F.C. players
Bath City F.C. players
Barnstaple Town F.C. players
Falmouth Town A.F.C. players
A.F.C. St Austell players
Footballers from Devon
English Football League players
Association football forwards